Puzi (Hokkien POJ: Phò-chú) is a county-administered city in Chiayi County, Taiwan. The Chiayi County Council is located in Puzi.

History
The settlement was formerly called Pho-a-kha in Hokkien. In 1920, during Japanese rule, it was renamed  and governed under Tōseki District, Tainan Prefecture.

After the World War II in October 1945, Puzi Township was incorporated into Tainan County. On 11 December 1945, the Puzi Township Office was established. In October 1950, Chiayi County Government was established and Puzi Township was incorporated into Chiayi County as a rural township. On 1 July 1992, Puzi Township was upgraded to a county-administered city.

Geography

 Area: 49.57 km²
 Population: 41,043 people (May 2022)

Administrative divisions
The township comprises 27 villages: Anfu, Bohou, Dage, Daxiang, Dejia, Dexing, Jiahe, Kaiyuan, Kanhou, Kanqian, Meihua, Nanzhu, Neicuo, Pinghe, Renhe, Songhua, Shuangxi, Shunan, Shuntian, Wenhua, Xikou, Xinliao, Xinzhuang, Yonghe, Zhongzheng, Zhucun and Zhuwei.

Government institutions

 Chiayi County Council

Education
 Chang Gung University of Science and Technology
 Toko University

Tourist attractions

 Mei-Ling Fine Arts Museum
 Peitian Temple
 Puzih Art Park
 Puzih Embroidery Cultural Hall
 Puzih Railway Park

Transportation
Bus station in the city is Puzi Bus Station of Chiayi Bus.

Notable natives
 Momofuku Ando, inventor of instant noodles
 Hou You-yi, Mayor of New Taipei
 Lin Chieh-liang, physician, nephrologist and toxicologist
 Twu Shiing-jer, Mayor of Chiayi City (2014–2018)
 Wu Rong-ming, Vice President of Examination Yuan (2004–2008)

References

External links

 Puzi City Government Office 

1992 establishments in Taiwan
County-administered cities of Taiwan
Populated places in Chiayi County